Electro-Shock Blues is the second studio album by American rock band Eels. It was released in the United Kingdom on September 21, 1998, and October 20 in the United States by record label DreamWorks.

Background and content 

Electro-Shock Blues was written largely in response to frontman Mark Oliver "E" Everett's sister Elizabeth's suicide and his mother's terminal lung cancer. The title refers to the electroconvulsive therapy received by Elizabeth Everett when she was institutionalized. Many of the songs deal with their decline, his response to loss and coming to terms with suddenly becoming the only living member of his family (his father, Dr. Hugh Everett III, having died of a heart attack in 1982; Everett, then 19 years old, was the first to discover his body).

Though much of the album is, on its surface, bleak, its underlying message is that of coping with tragedy. The record begins with "Elizabeth on the Bathroom Floor", a sparse piece composed of one of Elizabeth Everett's final diary entries. Later, the album's emotional climax is reached in two tracks: "Climbing to the Moon", which draws upon Everett's experiences visiting his sister at a mental health facility shortly before her death; and "Dead of Winter", a song about his mother's painful radiation treatment and slow death. The album's last song, "P.S. You Rock My World", is a hopeful bookend to "Elizabeth", containing subtly humorous lyrics that describe, among other things, an elderly woman at a gas station honking her car at Everett, incorrectly assuming he is the attendant, and his decision that "maybe it's time to live".

According to the Eels official website, the song "Baby Genius" is about Everett's father, a quantum physicist who authored the Many Worlds Theory, although Jim Lang, who helped with the song, believed it was about Eels former bassist, Tommy Walter.

Recording 

At the time of the album's recording, the only official Eels members were E himself and drummer Butch Norton, as Tommy Walter had left the band.

Electro-Shock Blues features guest appearances by T-Bone Burnett, Lisa Germano, Grant Lee Phillips and Jon Brion.

Release 

Electro-Shock Blues was released September 21, 1998 by record label DreamWorks. In addition to CD and cassette releases, it was also released on vinyl. This version included two 10" 33 RPM discs on see-through blue vinyl, limited to a small pressing.

Commercially the album didn't fare well, selling considerably less than the band's debut album, Beautiful Freak.

Critical reception 

Electro-Shock Blues was well received by critics. Robert Hilburn of the Los Angeles Times called it "a brilliant work that combines often conflicting emotions so skillfully that you are reminded at times of the childhood innocence of Brian Wilson, the wicked satire of Randy Newman and the soul-baring intensity of John Lennon." Marc Weingarten of Entertainment Weekly wrote that while the album "lays bare the horrors of terminal illness in songs that shift from clinical to disconsolate", its "real feat is in making death life-affirming".

Colin Cooper of Stylus Magazine, in a retrospective write-up of Electro-Shock Blues, described it as "an album that reeks of classic on all levels: scene is set, tone established, problem arisen, grappled, fought (nearly lost) and eventually—joyously—overcome." Sputnikmusic reviewer Robin called it "deeper than some ironic indie pop record: it's E's honest smack of tough love, and he is his own recipient."

Tour 

The Daniel Johnston song "Living Life" was played often on the Electro-Shock Blues tour, eventually seeing a studio release in 2004 on the tribute compilation The Late Great Daniel Johnston: Discovered Covered.

Track listing

Personnel 

Eels

 E – vocals, guitar, bass, piano, keyboards, lyrics
 Butch – drums, percussion, backing vocals

Additional musicians

 Jon Brion – Chamberlin and Hammond organ on "Climbing to the Moon"
 T-Bone Burnett – bass on "Climbing to the Moon"
 Lisa Germano – violin on "Ant Farm"
 Parthenon Huxley – guitar on "Going to Your Funeral Part I"
 Jim Jacobsen – bass and keyboards on "Going to Your Funeral Part I", clarinet on "Going to Your Funeral Part II", arrangements
 John Leftwich – upright bass on "Ant Farm" and "Dead of Winter", bowed bass on "Dead of Winter"
 Elton Jones – backing vocals on "Last Stop: This Town"
 Bill Liston – saxophone on "Hospital Food"
 Volker Masthoff – vocals on "My Descent into Madness"
 Cynthia Merrill – backwards cello on "Efils' God"
 Grant-Lee Phillips – electric guitar, banjo, backing vocals on "Climbing to the Moon"
 Stuart Wylen – ½ Rhodes, guitar, alto and bass flutes on "The Medication Is Wearing Off"

Technical

 E – production
 Michael Simpson – production
 Mickey Petralia – production, mixing
 Greg Collins – mixing
 Jim Lang – mixing, conduction
 Stephen Marcussen – mastering
 Chester Brown – sleeve illustration
 Debbie Dreschler – sleeve illustration
 Hugh Everett III – sleeve illustration
 Joe Matt – sleeve illustration
 Francesca Restrepo – art direction, sleeve design
 H. Scott Rusch – illustration
 Seth – sleeve illustration
 Adrian Tomine – sleeve illustration

Charts

Certifications and sales

References

External links 
 The Electro-Shock Blues Story from Eels' official website
 

1998 albums
DreamWorks Records albums
Eels (band) albums
Albums produced by Mark Oliver Everett
Concept albums
Albums produced by Mickey Petralia